Barbara Cully (born 1955 San Diego, California) is an American poet.

Life
She has taught at the Prague Summer Writers' Program, and teaches at the University of Arizona.  She is a contributing editor of Cue.

Awards
 1996 National Poetry Series Open Competition, for The New Intimacy
 Arizona Commission on the Arts Fellowship
 Writer-in-Residence for the YMCA Writer's Voice.

Works
"Night Fishing"; "Organizing a Piece of Cheese", Spork Press
"Repressed Theme", Berkeley
"You your day...", University of Arizona Poetry Center
 
 
   (chapbook)

Anthology

References

1955 births
Living people
Writers from San Diego
University of Arizona faculty
American women poets
American women academics
21st-century American women